Makkal Vizhippunarvu Iyakkam ("Popular Awareness Union") is a political party in the Indian state of Tamil Nadu. It was founded in 1999.

External links
 Info-page on the party (in Tamil)

Political parties in Tamil Nadu
1999 establishments in Tamil Nadu
Political parties established in 1999